Coleophora fergana is a moth of the family Coleophoridae. It is found in Transoxiana, a portion of Central Asia.

References

fergana
Moths described in 1961
Moths of Asia